Menstrie and Glenochil railway station served the village of Menstrie, Clackmannanshire, Scotland, from 1863 to 1954 on the Alva Railway.

History 
The station was opened on 3 June 1863 by the Alva Railway. On the east side were the station buildings and to the east was the goods yard. Further to the east was Glenochil Distillery, which was served by stabling sidings. It was known as Menstry in the Dunfermline Press when it first opened. It was also known as Menstrie and Glenochil in the 1900 and 1933 revisions of the North British Railway timetable and in the 1904 edition of the handbook of stations. This was changed to Menstrie and Tullibody in the May 1948 edition. Its name was officially changed to Menstrie and Glenochil in April 1954. The station closed on 1 November 1954.

References 

Disused railway stations in Clackmannanshire
Railway stations in Great Britain opened in 1863
Railway stations in Great Britain closed in 1954
1863 establishments in Scotland
1954 disestablishments in Scotland